The Fortune India 500 is a ranking of the top 500 corporations in India compiled on the basis of latest sales and gross revenue figures. The list is published annually by Fortune magazine. Fortune India is Fortune sixth international edition following local editions for China, Turkey, Korea, Indonesia as well as a special edition for Greece.

Fortune India is published monthly in English, through a licence agreement between Time Inc., the publisher of Fortune (US) and Kolkata-based ABP Group, one of India's largest media companies. The first issue of Fortune India was published in September 2010 with Dibyendra Nath Mukerjea as the editor and Pavan Varshnei as the president. In October 2011, the publication celebrated its first anniversary with a double issue.

The Fortune India 500 list ranks publicly traded companies by their annual audited total income for the financial year ending on or before 30 June. The list has been published in its current form since 2010, and also includes financial corporations and service providers, leading by revenue.

History

2021 Fortune's Global 500 list 
Reliance Industries retained at the top for three successive years, whilst State Bank of India climbed up to second place and Indian Oil Corporation fell to third place.

2020 list 
Reliance Industries continued on top place in the 2020 Fortune India 500 rankings, while Indian Oil Corporation and Oil & Natural Gas Corporation were second and third respectively.
Reliance Industries was ranked 96th in the Global Fortune 500 list, and the top 7 positioned companies in the Indian list made it to the global Fortune 500 list.

2019 list 
Reliance Industries exchanged positions with Indian Oil Corporation for the top place in the 2019 Fortune India 500 rankings, while Oil & Natural Gas Corporation continued on the third position.

2018 list 
Indian Oil Corporation continued on top place in the 2018 Fortune India 500 rankings, while Reliance Industries and Oil & Natural Gas Corporation was second and third respectively.

2017 list 
Indian Oil Corporation topped the 2017 Fortune India 500 rankings, and Reliance Industries was listed second. The next three places were taken by State Bank of India, Tata Motors, and Rajesh Exports, respectively.

2011 list 
Indian Oil Corporation, Reliance Industries and Bharat Petroleum Corporation dominate the list in the second year.

Zee Entertainment Enterprises (#1 media, #256 overall), Sun TV Network (#2, #347), HT Media (#3, #383), Network 18 (#4, #413) and Dish TV (#5, #437) are in the list of media companies in the Fortune India 500 roster of India's largest corporations.

Tata Consultancy Services (#1 IT, #20 overall), Wipro (#2, #25), Infosys (#3, #27), HCL Technologies Limited (#4, #49), Satyam Computer Services (#5, #153) and Tech Mahindra (#6, #161) are the top IT companies in the list.

2011 breakdown by city 
This is a ranking of the top ten cities, with the most global 500 companies.

2010 list 
Indian Oil Corporation topped the inaugural Fortune India 500 rankings, and Reliance Industries was listed second. The next three places were taken by State Bank of India, Bharat Petroleum and Hindustan Petroleum respectively.

See also 
Fortune 500
Fortune Global 500
List of largest companies in India

References

External links
 Fortune India
 
 

Companies of India
Lists of companies by revenue